The 2003 Paris–Brussels was the 83rd edition of the Paris-Bruxelles cycling race and was held on 13 September 2003. The race started in Soissons and finished in Anderlecht. The race was won by Kim Kirchen of the Fassa Bortolo team.

General classification

References

Paris-Brussels
Paris-Brussels
Paris-Brussels
Paris-Brussels
Brussels Cycling Classic